Behave: The Biology of Humans at Our Best and Worst is a 2017 non-fiction book by Robert Sapolsky.  It describes how various biological processes influence human behavior, on scales ranging from less than a second before an action to thousands of years before.

Reception 
A review in The Guardian called Behave "a miraculous synthesis of scholarly domains".  Kirkus Reviews called it "An exemplary work of popular science, challenging but accessible." A review in the Star Tribune considers Behave to be Sapolsky's magnum opus as well as "a stunning achievement and an invaluable addition to the canon of scientific literature." In Science Magazine's edited book review blog, Behave was described as "exceptional in its scale, scope, detail, and writing style".

References 

2017 non-fiction books
Biology books
Penguin Press books